The Crescent tram stop is a tram stop located on Line 1 of the West Midlands Metro north of Bilston just off the A41 Wellington Road, near Wolverhampton, England. It was opened on 31 May 1999.

Services
Mondays to Fridays, Midland Metro services in each direction between Birmingham and Wolverhampton run at six to eight-minute intervals during the day, and at fifteen-minute intervals during the evenings and on Sundays. They run at eight minute intervals on Saturdays.

References

 Article on this Metro stop from Rail Around Birmingham & the West Midlands
Article on this Metro stop from thetrams.co.uk

Transport in Wolverhampton
West Midlands Metro stops
Railway stations in Great Britain opened in 1999